The Civil Services Examination (CSE) is a national competitive examination in India conducted by the Union Public Service Commission for recruitment to higher Civil Services of the Government of India, including the Indian Administrative Service, Indian Foreign Service, and Indian Police Service. It is also colloquially referred to as the UPSC examination, and UPSC CSE.  and is conducted in three phases: a preliminary examination consisting of two objective-type papers (Paper I consisting of General Studies and Paper II, referred to as the Civil Service Aptitude Test or CSAT), and a main examination consisting of nine papers of conventional (essay) type, in which two papers are qualifying and only marks of seven are counted; finally followed by a personality test (interview). A successful candidate sits for 32 hours of examination during the complete process spanning around one year.

Process
The Civil Services Examination is based on the British era Imperial Civil Service tests, as well as the civil service tests conducted by old Indian empires such as the Mauryan Empire and Mughal Empire. It is one of the most difficult competitive examinations in India. A single attempt can take two complete years of preparation - one year before the prelims and one year from prelims to interview.  On average, 900,000 to 1,000,000 candidates apply every year and the number of candidates sitting in the preliminary examination is approximately 550,000. Results for the Prelims are published in mid-August, while the final result is published in May of the next year.
 Stage I: Preliminary Examination - Held in June every year. Results are announced in August.
 Stage II: Mains

 Examination - Held in October every year. Results are announced in January.
 Personality Test (interview) - Held in March. Final results are usually announced in May.

After the completion of Medical examination of the successful candidates and other necessary formalities, the training program for the selected candidates usually commences the following September.

Eligibility
Eligibility for the examination is as follows:

Nationality
 For the Indian Administrative Service, the Indian Police Service and the Indian Foreign Service
the candidate must be a citizen of India.
 For other services, the candidate must be one of the following:

 A citizen of India.
 A citizen of Nepal or a subject of Bhutan.
 A Tibetan refugee who settled permanently in India before 1 January 1962.
 A person of Indian origin who has migrated from Pakistan, Myanmar, Sri Lanka, Kenya, Uganda, Tanzania, Zambia, Malawi, Zaire, Ethiopia or Vietnam with the intention of permanently settling in India.

Educational qualification
All candidates must have as a minimum one of the following educational qualifications:
 A degree from a Central, State or a Deemed university
 A degree received through correspondence or distance education
 A degree from an open university
 A qualification recognized by the Government of India as being equivalent to one of the above

The following candidates are also eligible, but must submit proof of their eligibility from a competent authority at their institute/university at the time of the main examination, failing which they will not be allowed to attend the exam.
 Candidates who have appeared in an examination the passing of which would render them educationally qualified enough to satisfy one of the above points.
 Candidates who have passed the final exam of the MBBS degree but have not yet completed an internship.
 Candidates who have passed the final exam of ICAI, ICSI and ICWAI.
 A degree from a private university.
 A degree from any foreign university recognized by the Association of Indian Universities.

Age 
The candidate must have attained the age of 21 years and must not have attained the age of 32 years (for the General category candidate) on 1 August of the year of examination. Prescribed age limits vary with respect to caste reservations.
 For Other Backward Castes (OBC) the upper age limit is 35 years.
 For Scheduled Castes (SC) and Scheduled Tribes (ST), the limit is 37 years.
 For Defence Services Personnel disabled in operations during hostilities, the limit is 40 years.
 For Candidates belonging to ex-servicemen including Commissioned officers and ECOs/SSCOs who have rendered military services for at least five years as of 1 August, of the year and have been released
 on completion of assignment (including those whose assignment is due to be completed within one year from 1 August of the year otherwise than by way of dismissal or discharge on account of misconduct or inefficiency or
 on account of physical disability attributable to Military Service or
 on invalidation or
 Relaxation of up to a maximum of five years will be given in the case of ECOs/SSCOs who have completed an initial period of assignment of five years of Military Service as of 1 August of the year and whose assignment has been extended beyond five years and in whose case the Ministry of Defence issues a certificate that they can apply for civil employment and that they will be released on three months' notice on selection from the date of receipt of an offer of appointment, the limit is 32 years.
 For ECOs/SSCOs who have completed an initial period of assignment of five years of Military Service, the limit is 32 years.
 For PWD candidates, the limit is 37 years.
 For Domiciles of Jammu and Kashmir from 1 January 1980 to 31 December 1989, the limit is 32 years.
 For the Economically Weaker Section (EWS) category, the standard age limits apply.

Number of attempts
The number of times a candidate can appear for the exam are given below.
 General category candidates – 6
 OBC category candidates – 9
 SC/ST candidates – unlimited attempts till 37 years of age.

Appearing to attempt one of the papers in the preliminary examination is counted as an attempt, including disqualification/ cancellation of candidature. However, applying to sit the exam but failing to attend is not counted as an attempt.

Vacancies and selection 
Generally the number of vacancies varies every year. The number of candidates that pass the preliminary examination is generally 11 or 12 times the number of vacancies, and the number of candidates selected for the final interview is twice the number of vacancies. As per existing policies, reservation for SC/ST/OBC is applied to each level of the selection process.

Cut-off 
The cut-off marks of the examination of the previous years' are given below:

List of Services

Following are the services which one gets on qualifying the Civil Service Examination.

All India Services
 Indian Administrative Service (IAS)
 Indian Police Service (IPS)

Central Services (Group A)
 Indian Foreign Service (IFS) 
 Indian Audit and Accounts Service (IA&AS)
 Indian Civil Accounts Service (ICAS)
 Indian Corporate Law Service (ICLS)
 Indian Defence Accounts Service (IDAS)
 Indian Defence Estates Service (IDES)
 Indian Information Service (IIS)
 Indian Ordnance Factories Service (IOFS)
 Indian Postal Service (IPoS)
 Indian P&T Accounts and Finance Service (IP&TAFS)
 Indian Railway Management Service (IRMS)
 Indian Railway Protection Force Service (IRPFS)
 Indian Revenue Service (IRS-IT)
 Indian Revenue Service (IRS-C&CE)
 Indian Trade Service (ITrS)

Group B Services
 Armed Forces Headquarters Civil Services (AFHCS)
 Delhi, Andaman and Nicobar Islands Civil Service (DANICS)
 Delhi, Andaman and Nicobar Islands Police Service (DANIPS)
 Pondicherry Civil Service (PCS)
 Pondicherry Police Service (PPS)

Preliminary
The pattern of the Preliminary examination up to 2010 was based on the recommendations of the Kothari Commission (1979). It included two examinations, one on general studies worth 150 marks, and the second on one of 23 optional subjects worth 300 marks. Until 2011, when it was revamped, the preliminary pattern was sustained with only minor changes once every ten to fifteen years.

From 2011 onwards, the preliminary examination intends to focus on analytical abilities and understanding rather than the ability to memorize. The new pattern includes two papers of two hours duration and 200 marks each. Both papers have multiple choice objective type questions only. They are as follows:
 Paper I tests the candidate's knowledge on current events, history of India and Indian national movement, Indian and world geography, Indian polity panchayti Raj system and governance, economic and social development, environmental ecology, biodiversity, climate change and general science, Art and culture.
 Paper II (also called CSAT or Civil Services Aptitude Test), tests the candidate's skills in comprehension, interpersonal skills, communication, logical reasoning, analytical ability, decision making, problem solving, basic numeracy, data interpretation, English language comprehension skills and mental ability. It is qualifying in nature and the marks obtained in this paper are not counted for merit. However, it is mandatory for the candidate to score a minimum of 33 per cent in this paper to qualify the Prelims exam.

In August 2014, the Centre announced that English marks in CSAT will not be included for gradation or merit and 2011 candidates may get a second chance to appear for the test next year.

In May 2015, the Government of India announced that Paper II of the preliminary examination will be qualifying in nature i.e. it will not be graded for eligibility in Mains Examination and a candidate will need to score at least 33% to be eligible for grading on the basis of marks of Paper I of the Preliminary Examination. Those who qualify in the Prelims become eligible for the Mains.

Mains
The Civil Services Mains Examination consists of a written examination and an interview.

Mains Examination
The Civil Services Main written examination consists of nine papers, two qualifying and seven ranking in nature. The range of questions may vary from just one mark to sixty marks, twenty words to 600 words answers. Each paper is of a duration of 3 hours. Candidates who pass qualifying papers are ranked according to marks and a selected number of candidates are called for interview or a personality test at the Commission's discretion.

According to the new marks allocations in Civil Service Examination 2013 there are some changes made in the examination according to the suggestion of the Prof. Arun. S. Nigavekar Committee. However, after some controversy, the qualifying papers for Indian languages and English were restored.

1.The paper A on Indian Language will not, however, be compulsory for candidates hailing from the states of Arunachal Pradesh, Manipur, Meghalya, Mizoram, Nagaland and Sikkim.

List of languages 
The examination is available in the following languages, with the name of the script in parenthesis:

 Assamese (Assamese)
 Bengali (Bengali)
 Bodo (Devanagari)
 Dogri (Devanagari)
 English (English)
 Gujarati (Gujarati)
 Hindi (Devanagari)
 Kannada (Kannada)
 Kashmiri (Persian)
 Konkani (Devanagari)
 Maithili (Devanagari)
 Malayalam (Malayalam)
 Manipuri (Bengali)
 Marathi (Devanagari)
 Nepali (Devanagari)
 Odia (Odia)
 Punjabi (Gurumukhi)
 Sanskrit (Devanagari)
 Santhali (Devanagri or Ol Chiki)
 Sindhi (Devanagari or Arabic)
 Tamil (Tamil)
 Telugu (Telugu)
 Urdu (Persian)

Optional subjects 
The subjects available for Papers VI and VII are:

 Agriculture
 Animal Husbandry and Veterinary Science
 Anthropology
 Botany
 Chemistry
 Civil Engineering
 Commerce and Accountancy
 Economics
 Electrical Engineering
 Geography
 Geology
 History
 Law
 Literature of any one of the languages listed above
 Management
 Mathematics
 Mechanical Engineering
 Medical Science
 Philosophy
 Physics
 Political Science and International Relations
 Psychology
 Public Administration
 Sociology
 Urdu
 Statistics
 Zoology

Personality Test

Unofficially called the "interview", the objective of the interview is to assess the personal suitability of the candidate for a career in public service by a board of competent and unbiased observers. The test is intended to evaluate the mental calibre of a candidate. In broad terms, this is really an assessment of not only a candidate's intellectual qualities, but also social traits and interest in current affairs. Some of the qualities to be judged are mental alertness, critical powers of assimilation, clear and logical exposition, balance of judgement, variety and depth of interest, ability for social cohesion and leadership, and intellectual and moral integrity.

The technique of the interview is not that of a strict cross-examination, but of a natural, though directed and purposeful conversation that is intended to reveal the mental qualities of the candidate.

The interview is not intended to test either of the specialized or general knowledge of the candidate, which has been already tested through written papers. Candidates are expected to have taken an intelligent interest not only in their special subjects of academic study, but also in the events which are happening around them both within and outside their own state or country as well as in modern currents of thought and in new discoveries which should rouse the curiosity of all well-educated youth. The interview standards are very high and require thorough preparation as well as commitment.

See also 
 List of Public service commissions in India

Notes

References

External links
 Union Public Service Commission official website
 Civil Services (Preliminary) Examination 2020 official website
 archive of previous exams

Standardised tests in India
Union Public Service Commission
Civil service tests in India
1922 establishments in British India